Abu Ishaq Ibrahim ibn Ya'qub ibn Ishaq al-Sa'di al-Juzajani (born around 796 CE/180 AH – died 872 CE/259 AH) was a Persian Muslim hadith scholar, one of the imams of al-jarh wa al-ta'deel and a student of Ahmad ibn Hanbal. Some of the hadith scholars who transmitted his narrations include Abu Dawood, al-Tirmidhi and al-Nasa'i.

Biography 
He was born and raised in Jowzjan but moved to Damascus where he lived until his death.

Teachers
Some of his notable teachers were: Ibn Ma'in, Ahmad ibn Hanbal, Ali ibn al-Madini, Ishaq Ibn Rahwayh, Abu Thawr al-Kalbi, Hafs ibn ‘Umar al-Hawdi, Husayn ibn ‘Ali al-Ju'fi, Sa'id ibn Abi Maryam, Sa'id ibn Mansoor, Musadad ibn Masrahad and Yazid ibn Haroon.

Students
The well-known students who took knowledge from him were: Abu Dawood, al-Tirmidhi, al-Nasa'i, Abu Hatim al-Razi, Abu Zur'ah al-Razi, Abu Zur'ah al-Dimashqi and al-Dulabi.

Works 
The following is a list of works by al-Juzajani:

 Aḥwāl al-rijāl (أحوال الرجال) also known as Al-Shajarah fī Aḥwāl al-rijāl (الشجرة في أحوال الرجال): Modern editors of Al-Juzajani's works believe that this book was also called Al-jarḥ wa-al-taʻdīl (الجرح والتعديل), Al-ḍuʻafāʼ (الضعفاء), Maʻrifat al-rijāl (معرفة الرجال ) or Al-mutarjam (المترجم) by early Islamic scholars.
 Imārāt al-Nubūwah (أمارت النبوة)
 Masāʼil al-Imām Aḥmad (مسائل الإمام أحمد)
 Al-Tārīkh (التاريخ)

References 

790s births
872 deaths
Hadith scholars
9th-century Muslim scholars of Islam
Hanbalis
9th-century writers
9th-century jurists
Biographical evaluation scholars
People from Jowzjan Province